3-hexulose-6-phosphate synthase (D-arabino-3-hexulose 6-phosphate formaldehyde-lyase, 3-hexulosephosphate synthase, 3-hexulose phosphate synthase, HPS) is an enzyme with systematic name D-arabino-hex-3-ulose-6-phosphate formaldehyde-lyase (D-ribulose-5-phosphate-forming). This enzyme catalyses the following chemical reaction

 D-arabino-hex-3-ulose 6-phosphate  D-ribulose 5-phosphate + formaldehyde

This enzyme requires Mg2+ or Mn2+ for maximal activity.

References

External links 
 

EC 4.1.2